Apelles was a second-century Gnostic Christian thinker. He started out his ministry as a disciple of Marcion of Sinope, probably in Rome. But at some point, Apelles either left, or was expelled from, the Marcionite church.

Tertullian writes that this was because he had become intimate with a woman named Philumena who claimed to be possessed by an angel, who gave her 'revelations' which Apelles read out in public. Marcion preached that Christians should be celibate and should not marry, so Apelles' relationship with Philumena was unacceptable to the Marcionite church. Apelles then went to Alexandria, where he developed his own distinctive doctrine, a modified form of Marcionism.

Doctrine 
In some respects, the philosophy of Apelles seems to have been a retreat away from the thoroughgoing dualism and rejection of the material world found in Marcion's thought. For example, Apelles believed in only one Supreme God, as opposed to the two gods of Marcionism. According to Apelles, the Supreme God first created the heavens and the "powers and angels" who live in them. Then the Earth was created by a fiery angel who is subordinate to the Supreme God, who attempted to make a replica of the things that existed in the heavens, but failed to make them as perfectly as the Supreme God did.

Apelles also retreated from the docetism of Marcion's thought, which held that Jesus never came to Earth in the flesh. Apelles preached that Jesus did possess true human flesh, but he continued to deny that Jesus was born of human parents. Rather, Apelles believed that Jesus descended directly from heaven to the Earth, and that Jesus' body was made out of material borrowed from "the stars, and the substances of the higher world" during his descent through the heavens. He also taught that during Jesus' ascension into heaven, he dismantled his fleshly body, returning the elements with which it was made to the places he had found them on his descent to Earth.

The attitude of Apelles toward the Hebrew scriptures was somewhat different from Marcion's view. While Marcion believed that the Jewish scripture was a valid, historically accurate revelation from the creator god, Apelles apparently believed that the Old Testament largely consisted of "fables" and failed prophecies. Nevertheless, he seems to have regarded some parts of the Jewish scriptures to be inspired, although it is unclear which parts he regarded as true and which as false.

Despite their differences, Apelles did retain some important aspects of Marcionism. Like Marcion, Apelles denied the resurrection of the body. He believed that only the souls, not the bodies, of Christians would be saved and transported to heaven. Apelles also continued to use Marcion's Apostolikon, which contained slightly shorter versions of ten Pauline epistles, as scripture.

Legacy 
Apelles wrote several books, all of which are no longer extant. They included a book titled Revelations, which he claimed to have derived from the revelations of his partner Philumena. Apelles also wrote several books entitled Syllogisms, in which he attempted to show the falsity of various passages in the Pentateuch regarding God. The word Syllogisms itself suggests that Apelles may have intended to oppose Marcion's own book titled Antitheses, which set the Old Testament and the New Testament against each other. He is last heard of in Rome at the end of the second century AD.

Apelles' followers, known variously as the Apellitae, Apelliacos or Apelleasts, are likewise mostly unknown. Tertullian wrote a tract against them which has not survived. Ambrose of Milan in the 4th century directs some of his comments in his De paradiso (On the Garden of Eden) against this sect, but whether the sect was still active or whether Ambrose had merely copied another now lost work of Tertullian on the same subject is unknown.

See also
 Fathers of Christian Gnosticism
 History of Gnosticism
 List of Gnostic sects
 List of Gospels

Notes

References
 Tertullian, De carne Christi, introduction by Ernest Evans, 1956

2nd-century Christian theologians
2nd-century Egyptian people
2nd-century Romans
2nd-century writers
Early Christianity and Gnosticism
Gnostics